Norman Wells Airport  is located adjacent to Norman Wells, Northwest Territories, Canada. North-Wright Airways has its hangar and office adjacent to the airport.

Airlines and destinations

Cargo

Accidents and incidents
On 5 January 1972, Douglas C-47B CF-KAH of Mackenzie Air was damaged beyond economic repair at Norman Wells Airport.

See also
Norman Wells Water Aerodrome

References

External links

Certified airports in the Sahtu Region